The Valle de Guadalupe (Guadalupe Valley) is an area of Ensenada Municipality, Baja California, Mexico that is an increasingly popular tourist destination for wine and Baja Med cuisine. It includes communities such as Ejido El Porvenir, Francisco Zarco, San Antonio de las Minas and Colonia Articulo 115, and combined had 5,859 inhabitants according to the 2010 census.

History
The community was founded in 1834 by Dominican missionary Félix Caballero as Misión de Nuestra Señora de Guadalupe del Norte, making it the last mission established in the Californias. Caballero had to abandon the mission in 1840, under attacks from the indigenous peoples.

From 1905 to 1910, a mixture of Spiritual Christian faiths, mostly Pryguny with some Molokane from Transcaucasia, South Russia, settled in 4 farming colonies near Ensenada, Baja California Norte Territory, Mexico. Guadalupe was the main colony of about 20+ square miles purchased in 1905. Most owned or rented land communally. Not all were ethnic Russians, and were of various folk-Protestant (non-Orthodox) faiths. A few Russian Orthodox immigrants, had no priest or church, lived in Ensenada and were confused with the Spiritual Christians from Russia.

To make land and loan payments, paid in wheat, the settlers rented as much as 50 square miles from about 10 nearby ranches, north to the border. Most moved to California by World War II to join more prosperous relatives and work in the factories. Some intermarried with Spiritual Christian Dukh-i-zhizniki in California. Most of who remained, intermarried, assimilated and live in Ensenada and Tijuana.

When the valley economy shifted to wine-making, the Baja government funded a museum, to preserve the history of the former settlers from Old Russia and enhance wine tourism. Soon two private museums opened, one with a cafe across the street from the state museum, to provide Russian-Mexican dishes for tourists and groups. Roads are improved with asphalt paving to accommodate wine-tour buses.

Wineries

The Valle de Guadalupe's elevation and microclimate make it ideally suited for winemaking. As of 2018, there were over 100 wineries along the Valle's Ruta del Vino (Wine Route). Collectively, they account for 70% of all Mexico's wines.

Since the 1990s the Association of Winemakers of Baja California holds the Fiestas de la Vendimia (Wine Harvest Festival) in the Valle of Guadalupe and the town of Ensenada every year in August. The celebration includes wine tasting sessions, concerts and soirées, and samplings of regional cuisine and Mexican wines. 

Since 2017, the region has also held an Annual Valle Food and Wine Festival in October.

Wine tasting is available year-round, and several of the wineries have built up-market restaurant/tasting establishments aimed specifically at tourists from the United States. A winery tour is usually included on cruise ships that stop at Ensenada.

There are over 100 wineries in the Valle de Guadalupe, including:
 
 L.A. Cetto
 Monte Xanic
 Adobe Guadalupe
 Las Nubes
 Barón Balché
 Bodega Santo Thomás
 El Cielo
 Alximia Vinícola
 Trevista
 Vena Cava

Culinary scene
Many wineries in the Valle de Guadalupe have "campestre" restaurants on site that serve farm-to-table cuisine. Diego Hernández heads up Corazón de Tierra, rated by William Reed Business Media (the "San Pellegrino survey") as one of Latin America's 50 best restaurants, while chef Javier Plascencia is present with his Finca de Altozano, and Drew Deckman with Deckman's en el Mogor. The area is a center of Baja Med cuisine. La Cocina de Doña Esthela is proclaimed, by FoodieHub, to have "the world's best breakfast".

Hotels
Hotels include chef Javier Plascencia's Finca la Divina, Bruma, a 200-acre eco-resort including a working winery, 2 villas, and a 8-room hotel, and Encuentro Guadalupe (originally from Grupo Habita, now under other management), whose 20 eco-friendly rooms blend in with the landscape.

References

External links
 History of the Valley of Guadalupe and other wine-producing villages.
 Pryguny in Baja California, Mexico, by Andrei Conovaloff, Updated: 30 July 2016.

Cities in Ensenada Municipality
Populated places established in 1834
1834 establishments in Mexico